Diprenorphine (brand name Revivon; former developmental code name M5050), also known as diprenorfin, is a non-selective, high-affinity, weak partial agonist of the μ- (MOR), κ- (KOR), and δ-opioid receptor (DOR) (with equal affinity) which is used in veterinary medicine as an opioid antagonist. It is used to reverse the effects of super-potent opioid analgesics such as etorphine and carfentanil that are used for tranquilizing large animals. The drug is not approved for use in humans.

Diprenorphine is the strongest opioid antagonist that is commercially available (some 100 times more potent as an antagonist than nalorphine), and is used for reversing the effects of very strong opioids for which the binding affinity is so high that naloxone does not effectively or reliably reverse the narcotic effects. These super-potent opioids, with the single exception of buprenorphine (which has an improved safety-profile due to its partial agonism character), are not used in humans because the dose for a human is so small that it would be difficult to measure properly , so there is an excessive risk of overdose leading to fatal respiratory depression. However conventional opioid derivatives are not strong enough to rapidly tranquilize large animals, like elephants and rhinos, so drugs such as etorphine and carfentanil are available for this purpose.

Diprenorphine is considered to be the specific reversing agent/antagonist for etorphine and carfentanil, and is normally used to remobilise animals once veterinary procedures have been completed. Since diprenorphine also has partial agonistic properties of its own, it should not be used on humans if they are accidentally exposed to etorphine or carfentanil. Naloxone or naltrexone is the preferred human opioid receptor antagonist.

In theory, diprenorphine could also be used as an antidote for treating overdose of certain opioid derivatives which are used in humans, particularly buprenorphine for which the binding affinity is so high that naloxone does not reliably reverse the narcotic effects. However, diprenorphine is not generally available in hospitals; instead a vial of diprenorphine is supplied with etorphine or carfentanil specifically for reversing the effects of the drug, so the use of diprenorphine for treating a buprenorphine overdose is not usually carried out in practice.

Because diprenorphine is a weak partial agonist of the opioid receptors rather than a silent antagonist, it can produce some opioid effects in the absence of other opioids at sufficient doses. Moreover, due to partial agonism of the KOR, where it appears to possess significantly greater intrinsic activity relative to the MOR, diprenorphine can produce sedation as well as, in humans, hallucinations.

References

Delta-opioid receptor antagonists
Ethers
Kappa-opioid receptor agonists
Kappa-opioid receptor antagonists
4,5-Epoxymorphinans
Mu-opioid receptor antagonists
Phenols
Semisynthetic opioids
Tertiary alcohols